Prajakta Dusane is an actress and model from Mumbai, Maharashtra. She is best known for portraying as Sharmili  in the Hindi TV series  Dr. Madhumati On Duty on SAB TV. She is a very well known personality on social media platform, Instagram.

Web series

References 

Actresses from Mumbai
Living people
Year of birth missing (living people)